Lok Man is one of the 25 constituencies in the Kowloon City District of Hong Kong which was created in 1991.

The constituency has an estimated population of 15,428.

Councillors represented

Election results

2010s

References

Constituencies of Hong Kong
Constituencies of Kowloon City District Council
1991 establishments in Hong Kong
Constituencies established in 1991
To Kwa Wan